Siddharth Mridul (born 22 November 1962) is an Indian Judge. Presently, he is a Judge of Delhi High Court.

References

 

Indian judges
1962 births
Living people